Attadale railway station is a remote railway station on the Kyle of Lochalsh Line, serving the village of Attadale on Loch Carron in the Highlands, northern Scotland. ScotRail, who manage the station, operate all services.

History 

The station was opened in 1880 by the Dingwall and Skye Railway, but operated from the outset by the Highland Railway.

When the D&SR were forced to cut back the railway during its planning, Attadale was initially chosen as the planned terminus of the shortened line, to allow a suitable location near Loch Carron to build a pier adjacent to the station for steam boats to berth. However, more detailed planning proved this area of the loch quite shallow, which would have meant the large cost of building an extraordinarily long pier. Instead, the line was to terminate  further on at Stromeferry, where a deeper section of the loch could be found, meaning the steamers could berth more easily and more closely to the station at a shorter, less expensive pier. Attadale then opened as a request stop ten years after the Dingwall & Skye Railway commenced services.

Facilities 
The platform has a waiting room, help point, bench and bike racks. The station is not step-free. As there are no facilities to purchase tickets, passengers must buy one in advance, or from the guard on the train.

Passenger volume 

The statistics cover twelve month periods that start in April.

Services 
Four trains each way call (on request) on weekdays/Saturdays and one each way all year on Sundays, plus a second from May to late September only.

Cultural References 
The station featured in episode one of the Channel 4 documentary series Paul Merton's Secret Stations on 1 May 2016, when presenter Paul Merton alighted there en route to visiting a salmon breeding farm on the shores of Loch Carron.

References

Bibliography

External links 

 Station on navigable O.S. map

Railway stations in Highland (council area)
Railway stations served by ScotRail
Railway stations in Great Britain opened in 1880
Former Highland Railway stations
Railway request stops in Great Britain